The following is a list of notable deaths in April 1995.

Entries for each day are listed alphabetically by surname. A typical entry lists information in the following sequence:
 Name, age, country of citizenship at birth, subsequent country of citizenship (if applicable), reason for notability, cause of death (if known), and reference.

April 1995

1
Charles Bell, 59, American photorealist who created large scale still lifes, AIDS.
Stanley Adair Cain, 92, American botanist and pioneer of plant ecology and environmental studies.
James Cameron, 56, American football coach.
H. Adams Carter, 80, American mountaineer, language teacher, and editor of the American Alpine Journal.
Samson De Brier, 96, actor and occultist.
Francisco Moncion, 76, Dominican-American ballet dancer.
Johnny Nicholls, 63, English football player.
Lucie Rie, 93, British ceramicist, stroke.
Víctor Valussi, 82, Argentine football player.

2
Hannes Alfvén, 86, Swedish physicist.
Irv Frew, 87, Scottish-Canadian ice hockey player.
Henri Guérin, 73, French football player.
Julius Hemphill, 57, American saxophonist and composer.
Leo LeBlanc, 55, American country musician, guitarist, and pianist who was legally blind.
Raúl Martínez, 67, Cuban painter, designer, photographer, muralist, and graphic artist.
Dragoslav Mitrinović, 86, Serbian mathematician.
Harvey Penick, 90, American golfer, coach, and writer on golf.

3
Alfred J. Billes, 92, Canadian businessman and co-founder of Canadian Tire.
Charles H. Hayes, 88, United States Marine Corps general.
David Herbert, 86, British writer and raconteur, kidney failure.
Gracita Morales, 66, Spanish actress.
Park No-sik, 65, South Korean actor.
Vera Szemere, 71, Hungarian actress.
Marion Tinsley, 68, American mathematician and checkers player, pancreatic cancer.
Bogusław Zych, 43, Polish fencer, traffic collision.

4
Richard Adrian, 2nd Baron Adrian, 67, British peer and physiologist.
Lyndon Bolton, 95, British Olympic horseman.
Rita Cadillac, 58, French dancer, singer, and actress, cancer.
Kenny Everett, 50, British comedian, AIDS-related illness.
Abraham Kattumana, 51, Indian Catholic archbishop.
Priscilla Lane, 79, American actress (Saboteur, Arsenic and Old Lace, The Roaring Twenties), lung cancer.
Hansa Jivraj Mehta, 97, Indian social activist, independence activist, feminist and writer.
Shirley Patterson, 72, Canadian-American B-movie actress, cancer.
Jo Sinclair, 81, American novelist whose real name was Ruth Seid, cancer.

5
Nicolaas Cortlever, 79, Dutch chess master.
Adalbert Dickhut, 71, German gymnast.
Emilio Greco, 81, Italian sculptor, engraver, medallist, writer and poet.
Baby K, 2, American anencephalic baby who became the center of a medical controversy, heart attack.
Christian Pineau, 90, French Resistance fighter and politician.
Ron Richardson, 43, American actor and operatic baritone, AIDS-related complications.
Oskar Schnirch, 92, Austrian cinematographer.

6
Ioannis Alevras, 82-83, Greek politician.
Rogelio Farías, 45, Chilean football midfielder.
Alton Meister, 72, American biochemist.
Trevor Park, 67, British lecturer and politician.
V. J. Sukselainen, 88, Finnish politician and 24th Prime Minister of Finland.

7
Viktor Adamishin, 33, Russian militia captain, killed in action.
Peter Brinson, 75, British ballet and dance writer, lecturer, and promoter.
Nicholas Ingram, 31, British-American murder convict, execution by electric chair.
Philip Jebb, 68, British architect and politician.
Bill Lange, 67, American gridiron football player.
Hsin Ping, 56, Taiwanese Buddhist monk, kidney cancer.
Kannur Rajan, 58, Indian music composer.
Frank Secory, 82, American gridiron football player and umpire.

8
Maurice Allom, 89, English cricketer.
Hans Bodensteiner, 82, German politician.
Herb Connolly, 73, American politician from Massachusetts.
René de Buzelet, 87, French tennis player.

9
Bob Allison, 60, American baseball player.
Nguyễn Hữu An, 68, People's Army of Vietnam general.
Bonnie Bird, 80, American modern dancer and dance educator.
Paola Borboni, 95, Italian stage and film actress, stroke.
John Chamberlain, 91, American journalist, historian, columnist and literary critic.
George Hurley, 86, American gridiron football player.
Edda Mussolini, 84, Daughter of Italian fascist dictator Benito Mussolini.

10
Feng Depei, 88, Chinese neuroscientist and physiologist.
Morarji Desai, 99, 4th Prime Minister of India.
Annie Fischer, 80, Hungarian pianist.
Günter Guillaume, 68, German spy for the Stasi and politician, kidney cancer.
Glyn Jones, 90, Welsh writer.
Hannah Lamdan, 90, Israeli politician.
Billy Myers, 84, American baseball player.
Chen Yun, 89, Chinese political leader of the Communist Party of China.

11
E. K. Imbichi Bava, 77, Indian politician and a leader of the Communist Party of India.
T. Keith Glennan, 89, American administrator and first leader of NASA, complications from a stroke.
Vic Hey, 82, Australian rugby player and coach.
Nikolai Kostrov, 93, Russian Soviet painter, graphic artist, and illustrator.
Kim Yong-ik, 74, Korean–American writer.

12
Buck Cheves, 96, American college football player and referee.
John Dowdy, 83, American politician.
Alberto Larraguibel, 75, Chilean Army officer and equestrian, lung cancer.
Philip H. Lathrop, 82, American cinematographer.
Chris Pyne, 56, British jazz trombonist.
Mou Zongsan, 85, Chinese philosopher.

13
John Austrheim, 82, Norwegian politician.
Peter Bastiansen, 82, Norwegian politician.
Andy Branigan, 73, Canadian ice hockey player.
Edward F. Henderson, 77, British diplomat.
Lang Jingshan, 102, Chinese photojournalist.
Hal Peck, 77, American baseball right fielder.
Allan Scott, 88, American screenwriter.
Bill Thurman, 74, American actor (The Last Picture Show, Silverado, Close Encounters of the Third Kind).
Aleksandras Vanagas, 60, Lithuanian linguist and etymologist.

14
Mario Carotenuto, 78, Italian actor, cancer.
Brian Coffey, 89, Irish poet and publisher.
Michael Fordham, 89, English child psychiatrist and Jungian analyst.
Burl Ives, 85, American singer and actor (Cat on a Hot Tin Roof, The Big Country, Rudolph the Red-Nosed Reindeer), Oscar winner (1959), mouth cancer.
Hildegard Lächert, 75, German female guard at several nazi concentration camps during World War II.
António Lopes Ribeiro, 86, Portuguese film director.

15
Michael Aldred, 49, British record producer, music journalist, and television presenter, AIDS-related complications.
Emin Bektöre, 88-89, Crimean Tatar folklorist, ethnographer, lyricist, and activist.
Cleo Brown, 87, American pianist and singer.
Fred Cuny, 50, American humanitarian.
Gilbert Moses, 52, American film and television director, multiple myeloma.
Harry Shoulberg, 91, American expressionist painter.

16
Olavi Ahonen, 54, Finish basketball player.
Cheyenne Brando, 25, French fashion model and daughter of actor Marlon Brando, suicide by hanging.
Cy Endfield, 80, American screenwriter, director, author, magician and inventor.
Arthur English, 75, British actor and comedian, pulmonary emphysema.
Josef Hügi, 65, Swiss football player.
August E. Johansen, 89, American politician, Alzheimer's disease.
Iqbal Masih, 11-12, Pakistani Christian boy who became a symbol of abusive child labour in Pakistan", homicide.
Alfred Ryder, 79, American actor.

17
Ted Ball, 56, Australian golfer.
Jimmy D'Aquisto, 59, Italian-American luthier who buildt archtop guitars.
Anton Murray, 72, South African cricketer.
Frank E. Resnik, 66, American chemist and CEO of Philip Morris USA.
Max Wünsche, 80, Germany commander in the Waffen-SS during World War II.
Nan Youngman, 88, English painter and educationalist.

18
Arturo Frondizi, 86, Argentine lawyer and politician, 32nd President of Argentina.
Edward P. Gallogly, 75, American politician.
Rafael Chaparro Madiedo, 31, Colombian writer, lupus.
Roza Makagonova, 67, Soviet/Russian actress.

19
Preston Blair, 86, American animator (Bambi, Pinocchio, Fantasia).
J. Peter Grace, 81, American industrialist.
Porter Hardy Jr., 91, American businessman and politician.
Neil Paterson, 78, Scottish writer of novels, short stories and screenplays.
Aldo Richins, 84, American gridiron football player.
Richard Snell, 64, American white supremacist and convicted murderer, execution by lethal injection.

20
Elsa Benham, 86, American silent film actress and dancer.
Paul A. Catlin, 46, American mathematician and educator.
Milovan Dilas, 83, Yugoslav communist politician, theorist and author.
Sunil Jayasinghe, 39, Sri Lankan ODI cricketer, suicide.
Elting E. Morison, 85, American historian, military biographer, and author.
Bob Wyatt, 93, English cricketer.

21
José del Carmen, 77, Colombian fencer.
Stafford Heginbotham, 61, British businessman and chairman of Bradford City football club.
Amir Machmud, 72, Indonesian military general.
Malcolm Murray, 90, Swedish Army general.
Tessie O'Shea, 82, Welsh singer, instrumentalist, and actress, heart failure.
Roberto Parra Sandoval, 73, Chilean singer-songwriter, guitarist and folklorist.
Kang Shi'en, 80, Chinese communist revolutionary.
Carl Whitaker, 83, American physician and family therapy pioneer.

22
Carl Albert, 32, American musician, car accident.
Violetta Bovt, 67, American-Soviet ballet dancer.
Carlo Ceresoli, 84, Italian football goalkeeper.
Norton Clapp, 89, American businessman.
Charles Granger, 82, Canadian politician.
Tony Jaros, 75, American basketball player.
Jane Kenyon, 47, American poet and translator, leukemia.
Maggie Kuhn, 89, American activist and founder of the Gray Panthers movement, heart failure.
Henry May, 83, New Zealand politician of the Labour Party.
Don Pullen, 53, American jazz pianist and organist, lymphoma.
Joe Sheeketski, 87, American football player, coach, and college athletics administrator.

23
Douglas Lloyd Campbell, 99, Canadian politician who served as the 13th Premier of Manitoba.
Howard Cosell, 77, American sportscaster, heart failure.
Viktor Getmanov, 54, Soviet/Russian football player.
John C. Stennis, 93, American politician and U.S. Senator.
Lonesome Sundown, 66, American blues singer and guitarist.
Robert Selby Taylor, 86, Anglican bishop.

24
Ronald Alexander, 78, American playwright.
Hideyuki Ashihara, 50, Japanese master of karate who founded Ashihara karate, ALS.
Lodewijk Bruckman, 91, Dutch magic realist painter.
Stanley Burbury, 85, Australian jurist.
Florrie Burke, 76, Irish footballer.
Marie Epstein, 95, Actress, scenarist, film director, and film preservationist.
Iosif Kheifits, 90, Russian film director.
Johannes Ott, 75, German art director.

25
Lou Ambers, 81, American World Lightweight boxing champion.
Art Fleming, 70, American actor and first television host of the game show Jeopardy!, pancreatic cancer.
Andrea Fortunato, 23, Italian football player, leukemia.
Horst-Günter Gregor, 56, German swimmer.
Alexander Knox, 88, Canadian-British actor (Wilson, Tinker Tailor Soldier Spy, The Longest Day), bone cancer.
Walter Marty, 84, American high jumper.
Attilio Moresi, 61, Swiss cyclist.
Ginger Rogers, 83, American actress (Top Hat, Kitty Foyle, Primrose Path) and dancer, Oscar winner (1941), diabetes.
G. M. Syed, 91, Pakistani politician.

26
Bruce Bosley, 61, American football player.
Joseph M. Bryan, 99, American insurance executive, broadcast pioneer, and philanthropist.
Egon Franke, 82, German politician.
Otto Friedrich, 66, American journalist, author, and historian, lung cancer.
Sammy Jackson, 57, American actor.
Willi Krakau, 83, German racing driver.
Corliss Lamont, 93, American socialist and humanist philosopher.
Hugh Morton, Baron Morton of Shuna, 65, Scottish lawyer and judge.
Peter Wright, 78, English scientist and MI5 intelligence officer.

27
Ivo Arčanin, 88, Yugoslav swimmer.
Silverio Blasi, 73, Italian television and stage director, actor and screenwriter.
Albert Brown, 83, English cricketer and snooker player.
Katherine DeMille, 83, Canadian-American actress, Alzheimer's disease.
Willem Frederik Hermans, 73, Dutch writer, lung cancer.
Kent Peterson, 69, American baseball player.
Raphael Rabello, 32, Brazilian guitarist and composer.
Auto Shankar, 41, Indian criminal and gangster, suicide.
Steve Wittman, 91, Air-racer and aircraft engineer, plane crash.
Jerauld Wright, 96, United States Navy Commander-in-Chief, pneumonia.

28
Jacqueline Beaujeu-Garnier, 77, French geographer.
Thomas Binkley, 63, American musicologist and lutenist.
Peaches Davis, 89, Major Leagues baseball pitcher.
Corky Devlin, 63, American basketball player.
Wilfrido Ma. Guerrero, 84, Filipino playwright, director, teacher and theater artist.
Hana Janků, 54, Czech soprano.
Gus Polidor, 33, Venezuelan baseball player, homicide.
Henry C. Rogers, 81, American publicist.
Andrew Salkey, 67, Panamanian novelist and poet.
Walter Tracy, 81, English type designer, typographer and writer.

29
Inger Marie Andersen, 64, Norwegian actress.
Talley Beatty, 76, American dancer, choreographer, and teacher.
Angier Biddle Duke, 79, American diplomat and ambassador.
Gary Fallon, 56, American gridiron football player and coach.
Charles McGinnis, 88, American track and field athlete.
Ray Prim, 88, American baseball player.

30
Eric Barber, 79, English cricketer.
Christopher Chadman, American dancer and choreographer, AIDS-related complications.
Michael Graham Cox, 57, English actor (A Bridge Too Far, Watership Down, The Lord of the Rings).
Maung Maung Kha, 74, Burmese politician and prime minister.

References 

1995-04
 04